Marianne Andersen (born 26 March 1980 in Drammen) is a Norwegian orienteering competitor. She has received twelve medals in the world and European championships, as well as winning nine national championships. In 2017 she won a silver medal in the middle distance after seven years without a medal (mainly due to injury).

World and European championships
She received one gold medal, six silver medals and two bronze medals in the 2005, 2006, 2007, 2008 and 2009 World Orienteering Championships. She received further medals at the 2010 World Championships in her home country of Norway. In the European Championships, she achieved a silver medal in the 2004 European Championships with the Norwegian relay team, and two individual silver medals in the 2006 European Championships (Sprint and Middle distance). Andersen was then effectively away from the sport from 2011 to 2015, struggling with injury. She made a big comeback in 2016 her reward being a WOC silver medal at Middle Distance. She now has 14 WOC medals (1 gold, 9 silver and 4 bronze) - all but the new one from before 2011!

World cup
Andersen obtained one victory (middle distance, Auvergne, 2006), eleven second places and four third places in the World cup events, during the seasons 2005–2009. She finished second in the overall world cup in 2006, and second in 2009.

National championships
Andersen has won nine gold medals, three silver medals and four bronze medals in the National championships, and was awarded the King's cup in 2004 and 2007. She has represented the clubs Nydalens SK, NTNUI and Konnerud IL. In 2019, she won the Jukola Relay with Fredrikstad SK.

References

External links

1980 births
Living people
Sportspeople from Drammen
Norwegian orienteers
Female orienteers
Foot orienteers
World Orienteering Championships medalists